The Book of Law (transliteration: Ketabe ghanoun) is a 2009 Drama, Comedy, Romance Iranian film directed by Maziar Miri, written by Mohammad Rahmanian, and produced by Mohsen AliAkbari. The film is about a Lebanese woman and convert to Islam struggling with the contrast between the behaviour of Iranian Muslims and the principles of Islamic religion. The film stars Parviz Parastui and Darine Hamze.

Plot 

Engineer Rahman Tavana, a government employee, falls in love with a Christian girl, Juliet Khamse, while working in an international mission. She converts to Islam, changes her name to Ameneh, and moves to Iran with Rahman. Once in Iran she finds that she cannot accept what she sees as contradictions between the actions of Iranian Muslims, including her husband and his family, and the teachings of the Qu'ran, and eventually decides to return to the Lebanon, where she takes a job as a teacher for refugees.

cast 
 Parviz Parastui as Rahman
 Darine Hamze as Ameneh
 Negar Javaherian as Kokab
 Davood Fathali Beigi as chief
 Farideh Sepah Mansour as Rahman's mother 
 Roshanak Ajamian
 Fariba Jeddikar
 Behnaz Tavakoli
 Mehrdad Ziai
 Naiyereh Farahani
 Ahmad Mohebbi Sangari
 Vishka Asayesh as Maternity doctor

International Export 
The film failed to be granted an Export Licence by the Iranian Ministry of Culture because of fears that the film might be misinterpreted by Western audiences, and Western media would portray the film as an accurate depiction of Iranian life rather than a comedy.

Awards

Celebration House of Cinema

Tokyo International Film Festival
Despite not being granted an export permit, "The Book of Law" was screened at the Hong Kong International Film Festival in March 2009 and was nominated for Best Asian-Middle Eastern Film Award at the Tokyo International Film Festival in October 2009.

References

External links
 

2000s Persian-language films
2009 films
Iranian comedy-drama films
Films set in Tehran
Films shot in Iran
Films shot in Lebanon
Films about Islam